Peter Raymon Martin  (born 23 February 1962) is a Paralympian athlete from New Zealand competing in seated throwing events. He is a farmer, and became quadriplegic after sustaining a spinal injury in a farm bike accident. He competes in the F52 classification.

Biography
Martin won the shot put in the 1996, 2000 and 2004 Paralympics. He also won the javelin in 2004 and a silver in 1996.  Other events he has medalled in are the 2000 Pentathlon and the 2004 discus throw, making 2004 his most successful year with two gold medals and one bronze. He made a comeback for the 2012 Summer Paralympics; he reached finals but did not medal in his shot put and javelin events. Immediately prior to these games, he inadvertently took a banned substance for medical reasons. He was reprimanded but cleared to compete.

Martin remains the current F52 world record holder in javelin and has previously held world records in shot put and pentathlon.

In the 2005 New Year Honours, Martin was made a Member of the New Zealand Order of Merit, for services to paralympic sport.

References

External links 
 
 

Paralympic athletes of New Zealand
Athletes (track and field) at the 1996 Summer Paralympics
Athletes (track and field) at the 2000 Summer Paralympics
Athletes (track and field) at the 2004 Summer Paralympics
Paralympic gold medalists for New Zealand
Paralympic silver medalists for New Zealand
Paralympic bronze medalists for New Zealand
Living people
Members of the New Zealand Order of Merit
World record holders in Paralympic athletics
Athletes (track and field) at the 2012 Summer Paralympics
New Zealand male javelin throwers
New Zealand male shot putters
1962 births
People with tetraplegia
Medalists at the 1996 Summer Paralympics
Medalists at the 2000 Summer Paralympics
Medalists at the 2004 Summer Paralympics
Paralympic medalists in athletics (track and field)
Wheelchair javelin throwers
Wheelchair shot putters
Paralympic javelin throwers
Paralympic shot putters